Shiryayevsky is a rural locality (a khutor) in Preobrazhenskoye Rural Settlement, Kikvidzensky District, Volgograd Oblast, Russia. The population was 224 as of 2010.

Geography 
Shiryayevsky is located on Khopyorsko-Buzulukskaya plain, on the left bank of the Buzuluk River, 6 km southwest of Preobrazhenskaya (the district's administrative centre) by road. Preobrazhenskaya is the nearest rural locality.

References 

Rural localities in Kikvidzensky District